Fisherman's Wharf may refer to:

Fisherman's Wharf, Galveston, Texas
Fisherman's Wharf (Monterey, California), a historic fishing wharf in Monterey, California
Fisherman's Wharf, San Francisco, a tourist destination and still-functioning wharf, in San Francisco, California
Tamsui Fisherman's Wharf, a wharf located in Danshuei Township, Taiwan
Kaohsiung Fisherman's Wharf, a wharf located in the city of Kaohsiung, Taiwan
Fisherman's Wharf, Kowloon, Hong Kong, the former name of The Laguna Mall, a shopping mall located in Tai Wan, Hong Kong
Macau Fisherman's Wharf, a theme park located in Macau, China
Fisherman's Wharf (Stan Rogers' song), a Stan Rogers' song on the Fogarty's Cove album
Fisherman's Wharf (film), a 1939 American drama film